

Background
The earliest Peugeot models from 1889 were steam-powered tricycles, built in collaboration with Léon Serpollet. In 1890, Armand Peugeot met with car technology innovators Gottlieb Daimler and Émile Levassor and became convinced that reliable, practical, lightweight vehicles would have to be powered by petrol and have four wheels. The Type 2 was the first such model. Peugeot's one-time partner, Serpollet, continued with steam technology under the brand name Gardner-Serpollet until Serpollet's death in 1907.

Performance
The engine was a German design by Daimler but was licensed for production in France by Panhard et Levassor and then sold to Peugeot.

World record
Peugeot decided to show the quality of the Type 3 by running a demonstration model alongside the cyclists in the inaugural Paris–Brest–Paris cycle race in September 1891, thus gaining official confirmation of progress from the race marshals and time-keepers. This was the longest run to that time by a petrol-powered vehicle and about four times as far as the previous record set by Léon Serpollet from Paris to Lyon. The demonstrator became the first Peugeot sold to the public.

Italian production
In 1891 Costruzioni Meccaniche di Saronno of Varese, Italy, began assembling Peugeot Type 3 cars under a Peugeot license.

References
 Peugeot's 
 Histomobile's 

Type 3
1890s cars
Rear-engined vehicles
Vehicles introduced in 1891